W. L. Holman Car Company was a streetcar and cable car manufacturer based in San Francisco, California. It mainly built equipment for rail operation, including San Francisco Municipal Railway's first publicly owned streetcar, and some of the cable cars still operating on San Francisco's California Street line. Holman also constructed heavy interurban coaches and combines (combined passenger and freight-express cars) that ran on inland California electric railroads including Petaluma and Santa Rosa Railroad, Sacramento Northern Railway, and Central California Traction Company, as well as the Sierra Railroad, a Common Carrier line which operated out of Jamestown, California.

Holman declared bankruptcy in 1914. Some classic Holman cars are in the possession of the Western Railway Museum at Rio Vista, California. Another example is Ocean Shore Railroad passenger car 1409 currently under restoration by the Pacifica Historical Society.

See also 
F Market & Wharves
List of tram builders
Sacramento Northern Railroad
Central California Traction
Western Railway Museum

References

External links 
  Holman Car Company equipment at Western Railway Museum 

Manufacturing companies based in San Francisco
Tram manufacturers
Electric vehicle manufacturers of the United States